Kulothungan (28 September 1977 – 28 July 2018) was an Indian footballer. At the time of his death, he was playing for Bhawanipore F.C. in the 2nd Division I-League.

Career

East Bengal
He was a member of the East Bengal team which won the ASEAN Club Championship 2003 and won back to back I-Leagues in 2002–03 and 2003–04 under the coaching of Subhash Bhowmick.

Mohammedan Sporting
Kalia scored the equalizer for his side in the pre-quarter final of the 29th Federation Cup in 2007, however his side had lost 1–3 to city rivals East Bengal in the match.

Bhawanipore
In the quarter final of the 2012 Sikkim Gold Cup, he scored in the 3–1 win over Dimapur United on 5 November.

Death
Kulothungan died in a road accident on 28 July 2018.

Honours
East Bengal
IFA Shield: 2002

References

1977 births
2018 deaths
Indian footballers
I-League players
People from Thanjavur
Footballers from Tamil Nadu
East Bengal Club players
Mohammedan SC (Kolkata) players
Mumbai FC players
Mohun Bagan AC players
Chirag United Club Kerala players
Association football midfielders
Road incident deaths in India